The Monongahela Incline is a funicular located near the Smithfield Street Bridge in Pittsburgh, Pennsylvania. Designed and built by Prussian-born engineer John Endres in 1870, it is the oldest continuously operating funicular in the United States.

It is one of two surviving inclines in Pittsburgh (the other is the nearby Duquesne Incline) from the original 17 passenger-carrying inclines built there starting in the late 19th century.  Its lower station is across the street from what is now the Station Square shopping complex. It is easily accessible from the light rail system at the Station Square station.

It was listed on the National Register of Historic Places in 1974. In 1977 both inclines were designated as Historic Mechanical Engineering Landmarks by the American Society of Mechanical Engineers (ASME).

History

Pittsburgh's expanding industrial base in 1860 created a huge demand for labor, attracting mainly German immigrants to the region.  This created a serious housing shortage as industry occupied most of the flat lands adjacent to the South Side of the Monongahela River, leaving only the steep, surrounding hillsides of Mt. Washington, or "Coal Hill", for housing. However, travel between the "hill" and other areas was hindered by the steep terrain and a lack of public transport or good roads.
 
The predominantly German immigrants who settled on Mt. Washington, remembering the seilbahns (cable cars) of their former country, proposed construction of inclines along the face of Coal Hill.

Prussian-born engineer John Endres of Cincinnati, Ohio was commissioned to design the Monongahela Incline, which opened on May 28, 1870, as the first for passenger use. On the first day, some 944 fares were collected. But the second day, 4,174 people rode the incline and it became a success.  He was assisted by his American-born daughter, Caroline Endres, who was educated in Europe and became one of the first women engineers in this country.

Earlier inclines were used to transport coal in the Pittsburgh area, including the Kirk Lewis incline on Mt. Washington, and the Ormsby mine gravity plane in nearby Birmingham, which was later annexed to the city of Pittsburgh.

The Monongahela Incline was listed on the National Register of Historic Places in 1974. Both it and the Duquesne Incline were recognized in 1977 as Historic Mechanical Engineering Landmarks by the American Society of Mechanical Engineers (ASME). That year the two inclines served a total of more than one million commuters and tourists annually.

In the 21st century, the Monongahela Incline is operated by the Pittsburgh Regional Transit, which operates the rest of Allegheny County's transit system. Transfers can be made between the incline, light rail, and buses free of additional charge. It serves both commuters and visitors, and is a popular tourist attraction.

On February 2, 2019, flooding caused by a broken city water main forced the incline to close. The extensive repairs took time to complete, but the  incline reopened 13 weeks later on May 10, 2019.

Statistics
Length:  
Elevation:  
Grade:  35 degrees, 35 minutes
Gauge:   broad gauge
Speed:  
Passenger Capacity: 23 per car
Opened:   May 28, 1870
Renovated:  1882 (with steel structure)
Original steam power replaced with electricity: 1935
Renovated:  1982-83 new track structure, cars and stations
Renovated:  1994 upper, lower stations, restored cars, replaced electric motors and controls
Renovated:  2022-23 upper, lower stations, mechanical controls, electrical system, exterior track lighting

Gallery

See also

Angels Flight
Duquesne Incline
Funicular railway
Johnstown Inclined Plane
List of funicular railways
 List of inclines in Pittsburgh
Monongahela Freight Incline

References

External links

Lower Station from Google Maps Street View
Upper Station from Google Maps Street View
Pittsburgh Transit History Site

Rail infrastructure on the National Register of Historic Places in Pennsylvania
Funicular railways in the United States
City of Pittsburgh historic designations
Pittsburgh History & Landmarks Foundation Historic Landmarks
Railway inclines in Pittsburgh
Port Authority of Allegheny County
Tourist attractions in Pittsburgh
5 ft gauge railways in the United States
Railway lines opened in 1870
Historic American Engineering Record in Pennsylvania
National Register of Historic Places in Pittsburgh
Cableways on the National Register of Historic Places
Historic Mechanical Engineering Landmarks